RSSOwl is a news aggregator for RSS and Atom News feeds. It is written in Java and built on the Eclipse Rich Client Platform which uses SWT as a widget toolkit to allow it to fit in with the look and feel of different operating systems while remaining cross-platform. Released under the EPL-1.0 license, RSSOwl is free software.

In addition to its full text searches, saved searches, notifications and filters, RSSOwl v2.1 synchronized with the now discontinued Google Reader.

History
RSSOwl began as small project on SourceForge at the end of July 2003. The first public version was 0.3a.

Version 1.0
RSSOwl 1.0 was released on December 19, 2001. It was released with support for RSS and Atom News feeds. The initial release also supported exporting feeds to PDF, RTF, and HTML. This release was available for Windows, Mac, Linux, and Solaris.
RSSOwl 1.1 added support for toolbars and quicksearch in news feeds. Version 1.2 improved toolbar customization and added support for Atom 1.0 News feeds. Versions 1.2.1 and 1.2.2 added universal binary support for mac as well as drag and drop for tabs and a built in feed validator. RSSOwl was the SourceForge Project of the Month for January 2005.

Version 2.0
RSSOwl 2.0 was announced on March 7, 2007, at EclipseCon 2007. Version 2.0 was rebuilt on the Eclipse Rich Client Platform and used db4o for database storage and Lucene for text searching. Several milestone versions were released before the final 2.0 version that added labeling of news feeds, pop-up notification of new feeds and storage of news articles in news bins. The final 2.0 version was released as milestone 9 and added support for secure password and credential storage, news filters, support for embedding Firefox 3.0 XULRunner to render news feeds, and proxy support for windows.

Version 2.1
RSSOwl 2.1 was released on July 15, 2011, with Google Reader synchronization support and new layouts.

Forks
RSSOWL is no longer maintained  by its original developer however a maintained fork of it is available known as RSSOwlnix.

Features

Format support
Full support for RSS & RDF versions 0.91, 0.92, 1.0, 2.0
Support for Atom Syndication Format version 1.0
Generate PDF, RTF, and HTML documents from any news including aggregations

Organization
Powerful Newsfeed search engine working with keywords
Perform a fulltextsearch with resulthighlight on favorites and categories
Aggregate news of an entire category to one newstab
Save favorite newsfeeds in categories
Store newsfeeds in Blogrolls and share them with other people
Mail NewsTip to friends

Security
Authentication via BASE64, Digest and NTLM
Display HTTPS secure newsfeeds

Import and Export
Import and Export favorite newsfeeds using OPML (Outline Processor Markup Language)
Import and Export your settings in RSSOwl to use them on another computer

Other
Support for podcast downloading using news filters
Integrated Newsfeed validator
Erroneous favorites are marked
Read news either in the internal browser or a Rich Text window
Blog news viewed in RSSOwl with your favorite blogging tool
Huge list of sample Newsfeeds pre-saved
Select an auto-update-interval for your favorites
View properties of a selected favorite

Internationalization
RSSOwl is translated into many languages: Bengali, Bulgarian, Czech, Chinese (Simplified), Chinese (Traditional), Danish, Dutch, English, Finnish, French, Galician, German, Greek, Hungarian, Italian, Japanese, Korean, Norwegian, Polish, Portuguese, Russian, Serbian (Cyrillic), Serbian (Latin), Slovenian, Spanish, Swedish, Thai, Turkish and Ukrainian.

See also

 Comparison of feed aggregators

References

External links
 

2004 software
Free news aggregators
Java platform software
MacOS Internet software
Windows Internet software
Solaris software
Portable software
Cross-platform software
News aggregator software
Software using the Eclipse license